Kelly Brena is a Martiniquais footballer who plays as a forward for the Martinique women's national team.

References

External links 
 

Living people
Martiniquais women's footballers
Women's association football forwards
Martinique women's international footballers
Year of birth missing (living people)